George Newcombe Gordon,  (April 15, 1879 – March 22, 1949) was a Canadian politician.

Born in Brighton, Ontario, he was a barrister before being elected to the House of Commons of Canada from the riding of Peterborough West in the 1921 federal election. A Liberal, he was defeated in the 1925 federal election. From 1922 to 1925, he was the Deputy Speaker and Chairman of Committees of the Whole of the House of Commons. In 1925, he was the Minister of Immigration and Colonization.

He died in Peterborough on March 22, 1949.

References

 

1879 births
1949 deaths
Liberal Party of Canada MPs
Members of the House of Commons of Canada from Ontario
Members of the King's Privy Council for Canada